This is a list of German television related events from 1984.

Events
29 March - Mary Roos is selected to represent Germany at the 1984 Eurovision Song Contest with her song "Aufrecht geh'n". She is selected to be the twenty-ninth German Eurovision entry during Ein Lied für Luxemburg held at the German Theatre in Munich.

Debuts

ARD
 2 January – Rummelplatzgeschichten (1984)
 6 January – Der Jugendrichter (1984)
 27 February – Der Glücksritter (1984)
 11 March – So lebten sie alle Tage (1984)
 8 September – 
  Turf (1984)
 Matt in dreizehn Zügen (1984)
 16 September – Heimat (1984)
 17 September – Die Wiesingers (1984–1989)
 19 September – The Blind Judge (1984)
 21 September – Der Fahnder (1984–2005)
 22 September – Bei Mudder Liesl (1984)
 27 September – Das doppelte Pensum (1984)
 22 November – Tiere und Menschen (1984–1987)
 8 December – Tanzschule Kaiser (1984–1985)
 25 December – Patrik Pacard (1984)
 Unknown – Franz Xaver Brunnmayr (1984)

ZDF
 12 January – Lach mal wieder (1984–1992)
 3 March –  Der Mann, der keine Autos mochte (1984)
 31 March – Auf einem langen Weg (1984)
 1 April – Liebt diese Erde  (1984)
 14 April –  Helga und die Nordlichter (1984)
 12 May –  Angelo und Luzy (1984)
 22 May –  Die Lehmanns (1984)
 12 August –  Alles aus Liebe (1984–1987)
 19 August –   Die Schöffin (1984)
 28 August –  Heiße Wickel - kalte Güsse (1984)
 30 August –  Zwei schwarze Schafe (1984)
 6 September – Beautiful Wilhelmine (1984)
 23 September –  Berliner Weiße mit Schuß  (1984–1995)
 29 September –  Mensch Bachmann (1984)
 9 November –  Tegtmeier (1984–1985)

DFF
 6 January –  Front ohne Gnade (1984)
 24 April – Familie intakt  (1984)
 24 August –  Familie Neumann (1984)
 28 December – Drei reizende Schwestern (1984–1991)

International
18 June -  Magnum, P.I. (1980–1988) (Deutsches Fernsehen)
24 September - Sketchup (1984–1986) (ARD)
Eigener Herd ist Goldes wert (1984–1986) (ARD)

BFBS
 Chocky (1984)

Television shows

1950s
Tagesschau (1952–present)

1960s
 heute (1963-present)

1970s
 heute-journal (1978-present)
 Tagesthemen (1978-present)

1980s
Wetten, dass..? (1981-2014)

Ending this year
29 November - Musikladen (1972-1984)

Births

Deaths